Aldina is a genus of trees in the Fabaceae native to the Guiana Shield and northern Amazonia. It is found in lowland humid forests.

Species
Aldina comprises the following species:
Aldina amazonica M. Yu. Gontsch. & Yakovlev
Aldina aurea Cowan
Aldina berryi Cowan & Steyerm.
Aldina discolor Benth.
Aldina elliptica Cowan
Aldina heterophylla Benth.
Aldina insignis (Benth.) Endl.
Aldina kunhardtiana Cowan
Aldina latifolia Benth.
Aldina macrophylla Benth.
Aldina microphylla M. Yu. Gontsch. & Yakovlev
Aldina occidentalis Ducke
Aldina paulberryi G.A. Aymard
Aldina petiolulata Cowan
Aldina polyphylla Ducke
Aldina reticulata Cowan
Aldina yapacanensis Cowan

Species names with uncertain taxonomic status
The status of the following species is unresolved:
Aldina aquae-negrae M.Yu.Gontsch. & Yakovlev
Aldina barnebyana M.Yu.Gontsch. & Yakovlev
Aldina diplogyne Stergios & Aymard
Aldina polycarpa Stergios & Aymard
Aldina rio-negrae M.Yu.Gontsch. & Yakovlev
Aldina speciosa M.Yu.Gontsch. & Yakovlev
Aldina stergiosii M.Yu.Gontsch. & Yakovlev

References

Faboideae
Fabaceae genera